Eumeces blythianus, commonly known as Blyth's skink, is a species of lizard in the family Scincidae. The species is native to South Asia.

Etymology
The specific name, blythianus, is in honor of English zoologist Edward Blyth (1810–1873), Curator of the Museum of the Asiatic Society of Bengal.

Geographic range
E. blythianus is found in Afghanistan, India (Punjab), and Pakistan.

Reproduction
The mode of reproduction of E. blythianus is unknown.

References

Further reading
Anderson J (1871). "On two Saurian genera Eurylpis and Plocederma, Blyth, with a description of a new species of Mabouia, Fitzinger". Proceedings of the Asiatic Society of Bengal 1871: 180–192. ("Mabouia Blythianus ", new species, pp. 186–188).
Boulenger GA (1887). Catalogue of the Lizards in the British Museum (Natural History). Second Edition. Volume III. ... Scincidæ ... London: Trustees of the British Museum (Natural History). (Taylor and Francis, printers). xii + 575 pp. + Plates I-XL. (Eumeces blythianus, p. 385).
Finn F (1898). "Note on a specimen of the rare Scincoid Lizard Eumeces blythianus, (Anderson) from the Afridi Country; with exhibition of the type specimen". Proc. Asiatic Soc. Bengal 1898: 189.
Schmitz A, Mausfeld P, Embert D (2004). "Molecular studies on the genus Eumeces Wiegmann, 1834: phylogenetic relationships and taxonomic implications". Hamadryad 28 (1-2): 73–89. (Eumeces schneideri blythianus, p. 74).
Smith MA (1935). The Fauna of British India, Including Ceylon and Burma. Reptilia and Amphibia. Vol. II.—Sauria. London: Secretary of State for India in Council. (Taylor and Francis, printers). xiii + 440 pp. + Plate I + 2 maps. (Eumeces blythianus, pp. 340–341).
Taylor EH (1936) [1935]. "A taxonomic study of the cosmopolitan lizards of the genus Eumeces with an account of the distribution and relationship of its species". University of Kansas Science Bulletin 23 (14): 1–643.

Eumeces
Taxa named by John Anderson (zoologist)
Reptiles described in 1871